The Tidewater League was a minor league baseball league that played in the 1911 season. The Class D level Tidewater League consisted of six teams based in North Carolina and Virginia. The Suffolk team won the 1911 league championship in a shortened season.

History
The Tidewater League began play on May 11, 1911 as a Class D level league. The league president was William H. Hannan, Jr. The six–team league was composed of charter teams, all without monikers, representing Elizabeth City, North Carolina and the Virginia cities of Hampton, Newport News, Old Point Comfort, Portsmouth and Suffolk.

In the only season of league play, the Tidewater League regular season ended on August 1, 1911. Suffolk finished with a regular season record of 16–5 to claim the Tidewater League Championship. They were followed by Elizabeth City (8–5), Hampton (11–9), Newport News (10–11), Old Point Comfort (7–13) and Portsmouth (4–12) in the league standings.

Portsmouth folded on July 22, 1911. Elizabeth City folded on July 30, 1911. The Tidewater League permanently folded in their only season of play in 1911, ending play on August 1, 1911.

1911 Tidewater League teams

1911 Tidewater League overall standings

References

External links
 Baseball Reference

Defunct minor baseball leagues in the United States
Baseball leagues in Virginia
Baseball leagues in North Carolina
Defunct professional sports leagues in the United States
Sports leagues established in 1911
Sports leagues disestablished in 1911